John Alton Benton (March 18, 1911 – April 14, 1968) was an American professional baseball pitcher. He played in Major League Baseball (MLB) for the Philadelphia Athletics, Detroit Tigers, Cleveland Indians, and Boston Red Sox.

Benton is known for being the only pitcher to face both Babe Ruth (in 1934) and Mickey Mantle (in 1952). Benton is also the only player to have two sacrifice bunts in the same inning, against the Cleveland Indians on August 6, 1941.

Biography
Benton was born in Noble, Oklahoma, a small town a few miles south of Norman. In 1940, Benton led the American League with 17 saves.  In 1941 he went 15–6 with a 2.97 earned run average (ERA) (second in the American League (AL)) in 38 games. He completed seven of 14 starts and got seven saves. Despite his 7–13 mark a year later, his ERA was 2.90 with career-highs in starts (30) and innings pitched (226). Benton was chosen for the AL All-Star team in both 1941 and 1942, and then missed the 1943 and 1944 seasons while serving in the U.S. Navy during World War II.

Benton was discharged from the Navy in November 1944 and had his best year in 1945. He compiled a record of 13–8, a career-low 2.02 ERA, five shutouts, and 12 complete games in 191 innings. In a remarkable testament to the Tigers pitching in 1945, Hal Newhouser and Benton were No. 1 and No. 2 in ERA among AL pitchers.  Newhouser's Adjusted ERA+ in 1945 was 195 and Benton's was 175. The Adjusted ERA+ figures posted by Newhouser and Benton in 1945 rank as the first and fifth best seasons all time for a Detroit Tigers pitcher with at least 150 innings pitched. Benton pitched in relief in three games in the 1945 World Series and gave up only one earned run for a 1.93 World Series ERA.

The rest of his career he worked largely as a setup man or as an emergency starter. A two-time All-Star (1941–42), Benton compiled a career 98–88 record with 697 strikeouts and a 3.66 ERA in 1688 innings. 

Benton died in 1968 at the age of 57 from burns he suffered when the Lynwood, California, motel he managed exploded into flames.

See also
 Best pitching seasons by a Detroit Tiger
 List of Major League Baseball annual saves leaders

References

External links

 Baseball Library
 

1911 births
1968 deaths
Accidental deaths in California
Albany Senators players
American League All-Stars
Baseball players from Oklahoma
Boston Red Sox players
Chattanooga Lookouts players
Cleveland Indians players
Deaths from fire in the United States
Detroit Tigers players
Lincoln Links players
Major League Baseball pitchers
Memphis Chickasaws players
Oklahoma City Indians players
People from Cleveland County, Oklahoma
Philadelphia Athletics players
Sacramento Solons players
San Diego Padres (minor league) players
Toledo Mud Hens players
Williamsport Grays players
United States Navy personnel of World War II